Sergio Abreu Bonilla (born Montevideo, November 12, 1945) is a Uruguayan lawyer, diplomat, politician, musician and professor of International Law of the National Party (PN). Since February 15, 2020, he has served as Senator of the Republic.

He served as Minister of Foreign Relations (1993-1995) and as Minister of Industry, Energy and Mining (2002-2002).

Biography

Early life and education 
Son of a Paraguayan citizen who settled in Uruguay, Sergio Abreu graduated as a lawyer at the University of the Republic in 1974, and completed postgraduate courses outside the country at USC (1977), University of Texas (1980) and The Hague (1983).

Political career 
He served as the Director of Administration and Finance of LAIA between 1979 and 1989.

In the 1989 elections, in which the National Party (headed by Luis Alberto Lacalle) won the presidency, Abreu was elected Senator of the Republic for the sector of Renovation and Victory. In January 1993, he was appointed by Lacalle as Minister of Foreign Relations, a position he held until the end of the period.

In 1999 the non herreristas party elected him to complete the presidential ticket headed by Lacalle, who had won the internal elections of April of that year.

In March 2000, the new president Jorge Batlle appointed Abreu as the Minister of Industry, Energy and Mining. He held this post until November 2002, the National Party decided to withdraw from the Cabinet. Then resigned the portfolio he held.

In the 2004 election, he cast a pre-candidacy for the Presidency; but soon after, he decides to support Jorge Larrañaga, who is elected sole candidate for the National Party, and again the Party Convention elects Sergio Abreu as candidate for the Vice-presidency. Abreu was elected senator for the Alianza Nacional sector, a seat he assumed in February 2005.

He supported Jorge Larrañaga's candidacy for the presidency of the Republic in the 2009 presidential primaries. In the general election, he ran again for the Senate, being reelected for the 48th Legislature.

He was nominated for the 2014 presidential primaries. However, on April 7, 2014, he lowered his candidacy to support Luis Lacalle Pou.

In the 2019 general election he was reelected Senator of the Republic, for the 49th Legislature.

Artistic activity 
In January 2011, he released the CD Kuñakarai ("lady" in the Guaraní language) with themes of folkloric style.

External links

References

1945 births
Living people
Uruguayan people of Paraguayan descent
University of the Republic (Uruguay) alumni
University of Southern California alumni
University of Texas alumni
20th-century Uruguayan lawyers
Foreign ministers of Uruguay
Ministers of Industries, Energy and Mining of Uruguay
Uruguayan vice-presidential candidates
People named in the Panama Papers
National Party (Uruguay) politicians
Academic staff of the University of Montevideo
The Hague University of Applied Sciences alumni